Misty Fjords National Monument (or Misty Fiords National Monument) is a national monument and wilderness area administered by the U.S. Forest Service as part of the Tongass National Forest. All but  are designated as wilderness.

Congress reserved the remainder for the Quartz Hill molybdenum deposit, possibly the largest such mineral deposit in the world. The national monument was originally proclaimed by President Jimmy Carter in December 1978 as Misty Fiords National Monument, using the authorization of the Antiquities Act and became a part of an ongoing political struggle between the federal government and the State of Alaska over land use policy and authority that finally led to the Alaska National Interest Lands Conservation Act in 1980. In that law, it was statutorily established as Misty Fjords National Monument.

Physical geography
John Muir compared the area with Yosemite Valley for its similar geology and glacial morphology. Light-colored granite, about 50 to 70 million years old (Eocene Epoch to Cretaceous Period) has been sculpted by glaciers that gouged deep U-shaped troughs throughout the monument. Many of the glacial valleys are filled with sea water and are called "canals", but they are not man-made in any way; the walls of these valleys are near-vertical and often rise 2,000 to 3,000 feet (600 to 900 m) above sea level, and drop 1,000 feet (300 m) below it.

Across from the Salmon River and Portland Canal and the settlement of Hyder, Alaska, small glaciers occupy high areas of the northeast part of the monument. Soule and Through Glaciers cover high plateaus and valleys in the Lincoln and Seward Mountains, where one peak rises to 6,250 feet (1,900 m) above sea level.  Most mountain tops in the monument are in the 4,000 to 5,000 foot (1,200 to 1,500 m) elevation range. Tree line is usually around 2,700 feet (800 m).

Ecology
Western hemlock, Sitka spruce and western red cedar dominate the prolific rainforest vegetation; wildlife in abundance includes both grizzly and black bears, many species of salmon, whales, mountain goats, and deer.

Visitor access

Because of the remoteness of the area, most visitors arrive by boat or aircraft from Ketchikan or Juneau, Alaska. More adventurous travelers choose an overnight charter service or spend days exploring by kayak.

History
The region was first visited by Europeans in 1793 when George Vancouver explored up Behm Canal, the prominent sea-filled glacial trough along the western margin of the monument and separating it from Revillagigedo Island.  Vancouver discovered New Eddystone Rock, a 237-foot (72 m) tall column of basalt in the middle of Behm Canal. It was formed within the past 5 million years by volcanic activity, evidence for which is scattered sparsely through the monument, including a lava flow high above Punchbowl Cove, and at Blue River in the far northern part of the monument near the Canada–US border.

See also
Alaska National Interest Lands Conservation Act
Admiralty Island National Monument
List of national monuments of the United States

References

External links

Misty Fjords National Monument (U.S. Forest Service)
U.S. Forest Service: Ketchikan-Misty Fiords Ranger District
Misty Fjords National Monument Guide at GORP.com
Misty Fjords National Monument Wilderness - Wilderness Connect

National Monuments in Alaska
Tongass National Forest
United States Forest Service National Monuments
Fjords of Alaska
Bodies of water of Ketchikan Gateway Borough, Alaska
Protected areas of Ketchikan Gateway Borough, Alaska
Wilderness areas of the Tongass National Forest
1978 establishments in Alaska
Protected areas established in 1978